The Denderstreek or Denderland is a region in Belgium. It is named after the river Dender. Though the river stretches over three provinces, Hainaut, East Flanders and Flemish Brabant, the region called after the river is situated in East Flanders. The Dutch word streek means region. Thus Denderstreek means the Dender Region. Most of the Denderstreek is part of the Scheldeland (Scheldtland), the rest is part of the Flemish Ardennes.

Towns and communities in the Denderstreek

The Denderstreek includes the following towns and communities: 

 Aalst contains: Aalst, Baardegem, Erembodegem, Gijzegem, Herdersem, Hofstade, Meldert, Moorsel, Nieuwerkerken and Terjoden
 Buggenhout contains: Briel, Buggenhout, Opdorp and Opstal
 Denderleeuw contains: Denderleeuw, Iddergem and Welle
 Dendermonde contains: Appels, Baasrode, Dendermonde, Grembergen, Mespelare, Oudegem, Schoonaarde and Sint-Gillis-bij-Dendermonde
 Erpe-Mere contains: Aaigem, Bambrugge, Burst, Den Dotter, Egem, Erondegem, Erpe, Mere, Ottergem and Vlekkem
Geraardsbergen contains: Geraardsbergen, Goeferdinge, Grimminge, Idegem, Moerbeke, Nederboelare, Nieuwenhove, Onkerzele, Ophasselt, Overboelare, Schendelbeke, Smeerebbe-Vloerzegem  (Smeerebbe and Vloerzegem), Viane, Waarbeke, Zandbergen and Zarlardinge
 Haaltert contains: Den Dotter, Denderhoutem, Haaltert, Heldergem, Kerksken and Terjoden
 Herzele contains: Borsbeke, Herzele, Hillegem, Ressegem, Sint-Antelinks, Sint-Lievens-Esse, Steenhuize-Wijnhuize and Woubrechtegem
 Lebbeke contains: Denderbelle, Lebbeke and Wieze
 Lede contains: Impe, Lede, Oordegem, Papegem, Smetlede and Wanzele
 Ninove contains: Appelterre-Eichem, Aspelare, Denderwindeke, Lieferinge, Meerbeke, Lebeke, Nederhasselt, Neigem, Ninove, Okegem, Outer, Pollare and Voorde
 Sint-Lievens-Houtem contains: Bavegem, Letterhoutem, Sint-Lievens-Houtem, Vlierzele and Zonnegem
 Wichelen contains: Schellebelle, Serskamp and Wichelen
 Zottegem contains: Elene, Erwetegem, Godveerdegem, Grotenberge, Leeuwergem, Oombergen, Sint-Goriks-Oudenhove, Sint-Maria-Oudenhove, Strijpen, Velzeke-Ruddershove and Zottegem

Note: Den Dotter is a part of Erpe-Mere and Haaltert, Terjoden is a part of Aalst and Haaltert.

Tourism 

 There are several bicycle routes in the Denderstreek, including the Molenbeekroute (Millbrook route), Denderende steden (Dendering towns), the Reuzenroute (giants route) and the Ros Beiaardroute (steed bayard route).
 There are also motorcycle and car routes like Denderroute zuid (Dender route south)

Watercourses 

 The Dender, main river in the Dender basin.
 The Molenbeek-Ter Erpenbeek in Zottegem, Herzele, Haaltert, Erpe-Mere and Aalst (left bank) as a tributary of the Dender.
 The Molenbeek (millbrook) in Zottegem, Herzele, Erpe-Mere, Sint-Lievens-Houtem, Lede and Wichelen, being one of the Drie Molenbeken (three millbrooks), part of the drainage basin the Drie Molenbeken as a tributary of the Bovenschelde.

Geography of East Flanders
Regions of Flanders
Areas of Belgium